New York's 74th State Assembly district is one of the 150 districts in the New York State Assembly. It has been represented by Democrat Harvey Epstein since 2018.

Geography
District 74 is in Manhattan. The district includes portions of the Lower East Side, East Village, and Midtown East. The headquarters of the United Nations is within this district.

Recent election results

2022

2020

2018

2018 special

2016

2014

2012

2010

2008

References

74